Kruščica is a village in Serbia. It is situated in the Bela Crkva municipality, in the South Banat District, Vojvodina province. The village has a Serb ethnic majority (71.38%) with a seizable Czech minority (23.35%) and a population of 989 people, according to the 2002 census.

Name

Historical population

1961: 1,738
1971: 1,478
1981: 1,279
1991: 1,185
2002: 989

Gallery

See also
Kruščica Rebellion
List of places in Serbia
List of cities, towns and villages in Vojvodina

References

Slobodan Ćurčić, Broj stanovnika Vojvodine, Novi Sad, 1996.

External links
 Map of the Bela Crkva municipality showing the location of Kruščica

Populated places in Serbian Banat
Populated places in South Banat District
Bela Crkva